The 1951 World Table Tennis Championships – Swaythling Cup (men's team) was the 18th edition of the men's team championship.

Czechoslovakia won the gold medal defeating Hungary 5–4 in the decisive final group match. Yugoslavia won a bronze medal after finishing third in the final group.

Medalists

Team

Swaythling Cup tables

Group A

Group B

Group C

Final group

Decisive final group match

See also
 List of World Table Tennis Championships medalists

References

-